The Shuanghuan Laibao (来宝) or Shuanghuan Laibao S-RV is a midsize SUV based on the Honda CR-V manufactured by Shuanghuan from 2003 to 2010, with the chassis based on the chassis of Shuanghuan Laiwang, which was designed based on the chassis of the fifth generation 1992 Toyota Hilux.

Overview

Prices before discontinuation of the Laibao S-RV in 2004 ranges from 96,800 yuan to 115,800 yuan.

The design of the updated 2003 Shuanghuan Laibao S-RV is controversial as the midsize SUV heavily resembles the second generation Honda CR-V compact crossover.

Intellectual property lawsuit
On November 13, 2003, Honda filed a lawsuit stating that the Shuanghuan Laibao is a violation of the intellectual property of Honda, as the Shuanghuan Laibao heavily resembles the second generation Honda CR-V. In March 2006, China's State Intellectual Property Office made the decision stating that Honda's patent for the design of the Honda CR-V compact crossover is invalid.

In 2010, the Beijing People's High Court finally made the decision that the Shuanghuan Laibao of Shijazhuang Shuanghuan Automobile Co. had infringed the design patent of the Honda CR-V. Shijazhuang Shuanghuan Automobile Co. had to pay 16 million yuan (equivalent to 2.4 million US $ at that time), the final claim was 45 million yuan.

References

Off-road vehicles
Cars of China
Mid-size sport utility vehicles
Rear-wheel-drive vehicles
Cars introduced in 2003
Plagiarism controversies